Radio Arvyla is a Greek live panel show, filmed in Thessaloniki and airing on ANT1. It first aired in April 2008. It is hosted by Antonis Kanakis, Giannis Servetas and Christos Kiousis. This live show focuses primarily on the sociopolitical issues affecting Greece, especially with regards to the long-term fiscal crisis via the use of political commentary and various forms of makeshift parodies, montage and satire.

As of 2021–2022 season, it airs everyday from 20:00 to 21:00, although it used to air from 18.00 to 19.00 during the 2007-2008 and 2008–2009 seasons. The first episode of season 4 aired on 11 October 2010. All episodes from Season 3 and on are available online on the official website of ANT1. After ANT1, the show continued to Skai. For one year (2020) it was not aired in any channel at Greek TV, so some episodes were aired on YouTube. In early 2020 it was aired on OPEN and for the season 2021–2022 on ANT1. Stathis Panagiotopoulos was removed from the show in December 2021.

Format

The show used to begin with the segment "The bad joke of the day," where Stathis Panagiotopoulos tells a joke that is considered "cold". Afterwards, the "Top of the week" ("Top επικαιρότητας") segment begins, where videos from various events that occurred are shown, categorized into (usually 25) numbers (which a few of them tend to get skipped due the limited antenna time or too much laugh which are presented on the next show), for which there are satirical videos (comic skits, parodies etc.) that make fun of the original videos that were presented earlier. At the end of every episode, there is live music from (usually) new and up-and-coming bands. Internationally famous acts have also appeared, like The Zombies and Tim Booth.

Until the 6th season, Evgenia Samara or Christina Moustaka would be presenting funny videos found online or created by fans of the show, after the end of "Top of the week".

Starting with the 7th season, in which only one episode was airing per week, sketches have been incorporated into the format of the show. Besides the hosts, Kostas, the floor manager, and Stathis, a cameraman, make usual appearances in those sketches. Kostas (referred to as Kostakis) and Stathis (referred to as Pasoktsis) have been a part of some of the show's inside jokes for a while.

An invaluable and much loved member of the group was Sardela, Stathis' dog. She would come along to every taping and could be seen walking around the set. She died after the end of season 8. The hosts paid tribute to her on the first episode of season 9.

Episodes

Reception
A lot of "conservatives" like Kostas Prekas have criticised the show for "crossing the line", stating that "...they are making fun of everybody, they are pricks. This show must end.". The hosts have largely not paid attention to such statements, opting instead to make fun of them through their videos.

The show still remains one of the most popular shows on Greek television, especially among younger audiences.

Etymology
"Radio arvyla" is a Greek idiom that means "false rumor" or fake "news". Literally it means "army-boot radio".

References

ANT1 original programming
2008 Greek television series debuts
2000s Greek television series
2010s Greek television series
Greek comedy television series
Satirical publications